Sint Maarten Premier League is the top association football league in Sint Maarten.

Previous winners
1975–76 : PSV
1977–78 to 2000 : unknown
2001 : Sporting Club
2002 : Victory Boys
2003 : unknown
2004 : Juventus
2005 : C&D Connection
2005–06 : C&D Connection
2006–07 : C&D Connection FC (Philipsburg)
2007–08  to 2010–11 : unknown
2011–12 to 2014–15 : not played
2015 Flames United SC
2016–17: Reggae Lions
2017–18: not played
2018-19: C&D Connection (Philipsburg)
2019-20: suspended
2020-21: Flames United SC
2021-22: SCSA Eagles
2022-23:

Teams (2020-21)
C&D Connection
Reggae Lions
Soualiga
Hottspurs
Flames United
SXM Crew
758 Boyz
Belvedere FC
United Superstars
SCSA Eagles

References

External links
Sint Maarten - List of Champions, RSSSF.com

 
Football competitions in Sint Maarten
Football competitions in the Netherlands Antilles
Top level football leagues in the Caribbean
Sports leagues established in 1975
1975 establishments in Sint Maarten